Emadshahr  (also known as Maideh) is a city in Emad Deh Rural District, Sahray-ye Bagh District, Larestan County, Fars Province, Iran. At the 2012 census, its population was 6,547, in 1523 families.

Emad Deh's geographical area is characterized by dry mountains, most notably cou eh Gobbast-ya a mountain standing over 2000 meters tall, which separates Emad Deh from the village of Kal. 

It has greater resources than other villages in the area due to having many progeny who live in the richer Gulf Arab States. One such benefactor built a hospital in Emad Deh which is the only hospital in the area for at least 50 km. Others have served in high level governmental positions in both Emirates and Qatar where the cities expatriates have adopted an Arab family surname.

References 

Populated places in Larestan County
Cities in Fars Province